"Are You In?" is a song by American rock band Incubus. It was released in Europe and Australia as the fourth single from their fourth studio album, Morning View (2001), on July 15, 2002. The liner notes for the album contain no lyrics to this song (which all other songs have).

"Are You In?" became a moderate hit for the band, reaching number six in Portugal and the top 40 in Australia, Italy, and the United Kingdom. In New Zealand, it peaked at number five on the RIANZ Singles Chart, earning a gold certification for sales exceeding 5,000 copies and ending the year as the eighth-most-successful single. The song has since become a fan favorite and a staple during live performances.

Meaning

Many have speculated on what the song means; many have found that "Are you In" can refer to whatever the listener wants it to mean, although in the case of the video, it refers to a swingers club. Several have thought the song references smoking marijuana.

Brandon Boyd stated in an interview that the song was born from the start of a jam in the house on Morning View following an argument the band had. Someone started the groove and without talking, each member joined in one by one. Brandon said that he then went around the room with his microphone pointing to his bandmates and singing "It's so much better when everyone is in...are you in?"

Music video
A music video was made, although it did not gain much recognition. The video shows the band arriving and then performing in what appears to be a swingers club. The style of music as well as the video could suggest that the song is also about being "in" or "open" about swinging.

Track listings

UK CD single
 "Are You In?" (album version)
 "Are You In?" (Paul Oakenfold remix)
 "Stellar" (acoustic)
 "Are You In?" (video)

UK DVD single
 "Are You In?" (uncensored video)
 "Are You In?" (Paul Oakenfold remix audio)
 "Stellar" (acoustic audio)
 Behind-the-scenes footage from the Morning View Sessions

European 12-inch single
A1. "Are You In?" (album version)
A2. "Are You In?" (Paul Oakenfold remix)
B1. "Are You In?" (audio of live video)

European CD single
 "Are You In?" (album version) – 4:24
 "Are You In?" (Paul Oakenfold remix) – 3:43
 "Stellar" (audio of live video) – 3:42
 "Are You In?" (explicit video) – 3:28

Australian CD single
 "Are You In?"
 "Are You In?" (Paul Oakenfold remix)
 "Wish You Were Here" (live)
 "Warning" (live)
 "Stellar" (live)

Charts and certifications

Weekly charts

Year-end charts

Certifications

Release history

References

2001 songs
2002 singles
Epic Records singles
Immortal Records singles
Incubus (band) songs
Song recordings produced by Scott Litt
Songs written by Alex Katunich
Songs written by Brandon Boyd
Songs written by Chris Kilmore
Songs written by José Pasillas
Songs written by Mike Einziger